The Victorian Amateur Championship is the state amateur golf championship of Victoria, Australia. It has been played annually since 1899, except for the war years.

Two players have won the championship six times, Michael Scott between 1904 and 1910, and Eric Routley between 1952 and 1966. Ivo Whitton won five times between 1919 and 1924, while Harry Williams won five times in the 1930s.

Format
The event is a match play tournament. Matches are over 18 holes, except for the final which is over 36 holes. Normally the leading 32 players in the Port Phillip Open Amateur qualify. In 2020 the number of qualifiers was reduced to 8, the championship being played over two days instead three. In 2021 and 2022 there were 16 qualifiers, the championship again being played over two days with an 18-hole final.

The Port Phillip Open Amateur is a 72-hole stroke-play tournament played at Commonwealth and Kingston Heath golf clubs immediately before the Victorian Amateur Championship.

History
In 1894 the Melbourne Golf Club (later Royal Melbourne) founded the "Victorian Golf Cup" open to "all amateurs in Australasia". The Victorian Golf Cup rapidly established itself as the most important tournament in Australia, and was regarded as the Amateur Championship of Australia. The Australian Golf Union was formed in 1898 and organised their first championship meeting at Royal Sydney Golf Club in May 1899, the main event being the Amateur Championship. Although the Victorian Golf Cup continued in 1899, the Amateur Championship at the AGU championship immediately replaced it as the Amateur Championship of Australia. Despite some initial confusion, the Victorian Golf Cup became established as the Amateur Championship of Victoria. In 1897 and 1898, the Victorian Golf Cup had been played as a 72-hole stroke-play event and the same format was used in 1899. Jim Howden was the winner, by 3 strokes, with a score of 354.

Jim Howden won again in 1900, followed by Walter Carre Riddell in 1901, who finished 19 strokes ahead of the runner-up. In 1902 Royal Melbourne hosted the AGU championship meeting for the first time. No separate Victorian championship was arranged, the winner of the Australian Amateur simultaneously becoming the champion of Victoria and holder of the Victorian Golf Cup. Hugh MacNeil, a Scottish-born New Zealander who had recently moved to Sydney was the winner with a score of 328. There was tie for second place between Peter Anderson and Walter Carre Riddell, and a short 8-hole playoff was arranged to determine the winner of the second prize, Riddell winning by a stroke. Riddell won for the second time in 1903, this time by 27 strokes.

Michael Scott, the youngest son of the Earl of Eldon, had emigrated to Australia in about 1900 but had played little golf until 1904. Scott immediately showed that he was one of the leading golfers in Australia, winning the inaugural Australian Open and, later in 1904, the Victorian championship. He would eventually win all six Victorian championships that he played in, from 1904 to 1910, before his permanent return to the United Kingdom in 1911. He didn't compete in 1906, having made returned to the UK, enabling Riddell to win the event for a third time. William Bruce, an ex-Test cricketer, was the runner-up in 1905, having taken up golf after his cricketeting career had ended. Norman Brookes was the runner-up in 1906. He was better known as a tennis player, winning Wimbledon twice, in 1907 and 1914. There was another tie for second place in 1908 between Brookes and Audley Lemprière, Lemprière winning a 4-hole playoff to take the second prize.
Lemprière  won the championship in 1911, with Ivo Whitton runner-up. The 1913 Australian championship meeting was originally planned to be played at The Australian Golf Club in Sydney, but was moved to Royal Melbourne because of a smallpox outbreak and the poor condition of the course, caused by wet weather. As a result, the Victorian Amateur Championship was played as part of the Metropolitan Golf Club's annual meeting. Following closely after the Australian championship meeting, many of the leading Victorian golfers could not attend for business reasons. The championship was won by Gordon Burnham, an Aide-de-Camp to the Governor-General of Australia.

Ivo Whitton was a runner-up in 1911 but didn't play in 1912, 1913 or 1914. When the championship resumed in 1919, after World War I, Whitton was the winner, 8 strokes ahead of Bruce Pearce. 1920 saw two major changes, the venue varied from year to year, the 1920 championship being played at Victoria Golf Club, and the championship was the first to be played by match play. There was a 36-hole stroke-play stage with the leading 16 qualifying. Matches were over 18 holes, except for the final which was over 36 holes. Whitton retained his title, beating Pearce in the final. The 1921 championship returned to stroke-play but match-play was restored in 1922, with 8 qualifiers playing three rounds of 36-hole match-play. Whitton didn't play in 1921 but won again in 1922, 1923 and 1924, a run of 5 wins in 6 years. The winner continued to receive the Victorian Golf Cup, and a permanent trophy valued at 5 guineas, with the runner-up getting a trophy valued at 3 guineas. The number of qualifiers was increased to 16 in 1929, with 4 days of 36-hole match play.

Harry Williams dominated the 1930s, winning 5 times between 1931 and 1939. Mick Ryan won twice, in 1930 and 1932, but lost three finals to Williams, in 1931, 1934 and 1936. The format was revised in 1937, the championship becoming match-play only, with matches over 18 holes except for the final. In 1939 there was a return to the 36-hole stroke-play stage, but with 32 qualifiers. All matches were then over 36 holes.

1946 saw a return to the format used in 1937 and 1938. Peter Thomson won in 1948, his last before turning professional. Thomson beat Doug Bachli in the final but Bachli would win in 1949 and 1950 and for a third time in 1953. Bill Edgar won for a third time in 1951, his previous wins being in 1927 and 1938. In 1951 there were 88 entries and a 36-hole stroke-play event was organised to reduce the field to 64. Many of the leading players complained about the arrangement and the format was revised in 1952, with the leading 16 amateurs in the Victorian Close Championship qualifying, all matches being over 36 holes. Eric Routley won the championship in 1952, the first of six wins in the event. He won again in 1958, 1959, 1960, 1963 and 1966. There was no Close Championship in 1956 and a 36-hole amateur medal championship was organised instead, the leading 16 qualifying. From 1957 the Victorian Open acted as the qualifying event.

In 1964 the number of qualifiers was increased to 32, with the first two rounds of match-play being over 18 holes. John Lindsay was a three-time winner, in 1968, 1970 and 1983, as was Mike Cahill who won three years in a row from 1971 to 1973. Neil Titheridge won the championship two years in succession, in 1961 and 1962. Don Reiter won in 1967 and 1974 and was followed by his brother Alan in 1976. The 1990s saw a number of wins by players who went on to have successful professionals careers. Robert Allenby in 1990, Stuart Appleby in 1991, Geoff Ogilvy in 1997 and Aaron Baddeley in 1998, all won on the PGA Tour in America and reached the top-20 of the world rankings. A number of other winners would later reach the top-100 of the world rankings, including Mike Clayton, Bradley Hughes and Craig Spence, who each won the championship twice, and Marcus Fraser, James Morrison and Cameron Davis.

Winners

Additional source:

References

External links

Amateur golf tournaments in Australia
Golf in Victoria (Australia)
Recurring sporting events established in 1899
1899 establishments in Australia